I Saw Such Things in My Sleep EP is the debut EP from British indie rock band Guillemots released in 2005. It comprises 4 tracks and sold out on the day of release after much attention from radio presenters across the UK. A limited version of the EP was also released in vinyl 10".

Only 1,000 copies of the EP were pressed. The four tracks were re-released on the international mini-album From The Cliffs in 2006.

Track listing
"Who Left The Lights Off Baby?" – 5:04
"Cats Eyes" – 6:43
"Made Up Lovesong #43" – 3:35
"Over The Stairs" – 9:08

References

2005 debut EPs
Guillemots (band) albums
Fantastic Plastic Records EPs